The women's marathon event  at the Friendship Games was held on 18 August 1984 at the Evžen Rošický Stadium in Prague, Czechoslovakia. The start and finish line were in the Výstaviště Praha (then known as Park kultury an oddechu Julia Fučíka).

Results

See also
Athletics at the 1984 Summer Olympics – Women's marathon

References
 

Athletics at the Friendship Games
Friendship Games